Gubino is the name of several rural localities in Russia:
Gubino, Klinsky District, Moscow Oblast, a village in Klinsky District of Moscow Oblast
Gubino, Mozhaysky District, Moscow Oblast, a village in Mozhaysky District of Moscow Oblast
Gubino, Orekhovo-Zuyevsky District, Moscow Oblast, a village in Orekhovo-Zuyevsky District of Moscow Oblast
Gubino, Shatursky District, Moscow Oblast, a village in Shatursky District of Moscow Oblast
Gubino, Voskresensky District, Moscow Oblast, a village in Voskresensky District of Moscow Oblast
Gubino, Novgorod Oblast, a village in Novgorod Oblast
Gubino, name of several other rural localities